Təklə Mirzəbaba (also, Kiçik Təklə, Cır Təklə and Balaca Təklə) is a village in the Gobustan Rayon of Azerbaijan.

References 

Populated places in Gobustan District